The 2021 New Brunswick New Democratic Party leadership election in Canada was held on September 14, 2021 to choose the leader of the New Brunswick New Democratic Party. As the lone candidate, Interim leader Mackenzie Thomason was acclaimed party leader.

References 

New Brunswick New Democratic Party leadership elections in New Brunswick
2021 in New Brunswick
2021 elections in Canada
2021 political party leadership elections